Mind Game is the second title in the Ghostwalker Series of paranormal romance by Christine Feehan. It appeared in 15 bestseller lists including those of The New York Times, Publishers Weekly, and USA Today.

Plot introduction

After being targeted by an assassin, Dahlia Le Blanc, a Telekinetic who shirks the company of others, is forced to rely on the mysterious warrior Nicolas Trevane to protect her. A man whom she finds herself falling in love with despite not wholly trusting.

Awards and nominations
2004 Pearl Award
Winner for Best Fantasy
2004 Hughey Award  
Winner for Best Other Paranormal Romance (witches, elves, magical powers, fantasy, etc.)

See also

Shadow Game
Night Game
Conspiracy Game
Deadly Game
Ghostwalker

References

2004 American novels
Novels by Christine Feehan